Moses Pallache  (died 1650), was a Jewish-Moroccan-born merchant and diplomat of the Pallache family, who emerged as leader of his second generation.

Background

Pallache was born to father Joseph Pallache; his uncle was Samuel Pallache.

He studied languages at the University of Leiden without registering there.

Career

Thanks to his many languages known, as a young man he was able to help his father and uncle prepare important negotiations, for which they rewarded him.

The States General of the Netherlands considered him a jeune homme de bonne expectation et fort qualifié et entendu en affaires et plusieurs langages ("young man of good prospects, very qualified, and knowledgeable in business affairs and several languages").

He partook in a mission to Istanbul (1614-1616).

After the death of his uncle Samuel, he went to live in Morocco and served at the court of Fez, where 1622–1642 he served as European secretary and interpreter.  He became a chief interpreter and translator from Spanish, Dutch, and French into Arabic for the rules of Morocco.  During those years, he served under four sultans of Morocco (1618 to 1650):  Muley Zaydan (1603–1627), Muley Abd al-Malik (1623–1627), Muley al-Walid  (1631–1636), and Muley Muhammad al-Shakh al-Saghir (1636–1655).  "He became a very important and influential figure at the Moroccan court, responsible for international and diplomatic dealings."

In 1656, Menasseh ben Israel wrote, 'In the Kingdom of Barbary, their [sic] lives also a great number of Iews ... at Marrocco, the Court and Kings house, where they have their Naguid or Prince that governs them, and is their Iudge, and is called at this day, Seignor Moseh Palache'.

His name appears in English records from 1636 to his death.  It also appears in the Spanish translation of a 1638 treaty between the English and Moroccans.

His prominence in Morocco led many relatives to return there from the Netherlands, including his brothers Joshua and Abraham.  Joshua became a tax official.  Abraham set up in the port of Safi, where he provisioned ships and served as unofficial consult for the Dutch.

Death

Pallache probably died in Morocco around 1650.

See also
 Sephardic Jews in the Netherlands
 History of the Jews in the Netherlands
 History of the Jews in Morocco
 Morocco–Netherlands relations
 Islam and Protestantism
 Pallache family
 Pallache (surname)
 Samuel ha-Levi (ancestor)
 Samuel Pallache (uncle)
 Joseph Pallache (father)
 David Pallache (brother)
 Isaac Pallache (brother)
 Haim Palachi (descendant)
 Abraham Palacci (descendant)
 Rahamim Nissim Palacci (descendant)
 Joseph Palacci (descendant)
 Juda Lion Palache
 Charles Palache (descendant)

References

External sources
 
 
 
 
 
 Anno: Joodse Marokkaan onder christenen (Dutch)
 Universiteit Leiden: Openingscollege 400 jaar Marokkaans - Nederlandse betrekkingen (Dutch)
 Review van Gerard Wiegers en Mercedes García-Arenal, Man of three worlds. Samuel Pallache, a Moroccan Jew in Catholic and Protestant Europe (Dutch)
 Wereldomroep: Diplomaat, handelaar, kaper en geleerde (Dutch)

1650 deaths
Year of birth unknown
Year of death uncertain
Moroccan businesspeople
Dutch Sephardi Jews
17th-century Moroccan Jews
Moroccan diplomats
People from Fez, Morocco
Diplomats from Amsterdam
16th-century Moroccan Jews
16th-century Dutch businesspeople
17th-century Dutch businesspeople
Moroccan emigrants to the Netherlands
Businesspeople from Amsterdam